William C. Thompson (30 March 1889 in Bound Brook, New Jersey – 22 October 1963 in Los Angeles) was an American cinematographer.

He started his career in the 1910s and is best remembered today as the cinematographer of many of the films of Ed Wood, including Glen or Glenda (1953), Jail Bait, The Sinister Urge (1960), Night of the Ghouls (1959), The Violent Years (1955), Bride of the Monster (1955) and Plan 9 from Outer Space (1957). Other films he worked on include Maniac (1934), Dementia (1955), Journey to Freedom (1957), and The Astounding She-Monster (1957).

Partial filmography
 Shore Acres (1914)
 Destiny (1915)
 The Curse of Eve (1917)
 Revenge (1918)
 Satan Junior (1919)
 Pals (1925)
 Trails of the Golden West (1931)
 Pueblo Terror (1931)
 Found Alive (1933)
 A Demon for Trouble (1934)
 The Brand of Hate (1934)
 The Irish Gringo (1935) also produced and directed
 Lucky Fugitives (1936)
 Project Moon Base (1953)

External links

American cinematographers
1889 births
1963 deaths